Laurence Ferrari (born 5 July 1966) is a French journalist, best known as a former anchor of the TF1 weekday evening news Le 20H. She also works for Europe1 sometimes.

Biography

Early life and education
Ferrari was born in Aix-les-Bains, Savoie, the daughter of a former mayor of the city and member of the French National Assembly, Gratien Ferrari, of Italian ancestry from Emilia-Romagna. She attended the École Française des Attachés de Presse (French School for Press Attachés) in Lyon and graduated from the Sorbonne University with a Master of 'Communication Politique and Sociale'. She is the eldest of three sisters and an accomplished pianist.

Media career
She started her career in 1986 as a stringer at the French news agency, AFP, and Le Figaro Magazine. She also worked at the French language radio station, Europe 1, as a researcher with special responsibility for health policy. She began her television career in 1994 with Michel Drucker in Studio Gabriel on France 2 and thereafter with Jean-Pierre Pernaut in "Combien ça coûte ?" on TF1. In 2001 she co-hosted the TF1 Sunday evening magazine Sept à Huit with her former husband, Thomas Hugues. After her divorce, she moved in 2006 to Canal + to present the channel's weekly political magazine  "Dimanche +" where she covered the French presidential election of 2007. In June 2008, she became the new anchor of "Le 20 Heures de TF1" (the flagship TV news programme, which has the highest ratings in Europe), replacing its long-serving anchor Patrick Poivre d'Arvor, and taking over the weekday programme on 25 August 2008.

Ferrari incited controversy in 2010 by wearing a veil to interview Mahmoud Ahmadinejad.

Ferrari presented her final 8pm newscast for TF1 on 31 May 2012, a day after announcing her resignation from the network in order to join Direct 8.

Humanitarian work
Laurence Ferrari has been an ambassador for SOS Children's Villages since November 2003.

In March 2007, along with other famous personalities including journalists Claire Chazal, Marie Drucker, Tina Keiffer, Béatrice Schönberg and Mélissa Theuriau, she sponsored the La Rose Marie Claire project with UNICEF to help educate young girls.

Private life
In October 2007, Laurence Ferrari and Thomas Hugues separated on friendly terms, after 14 years of marriage (since 1993) and two children (a son and a daughter).

Partners since 2008, she and the violinist, Renaud Capuçon, married in July 2009 in the 16th arrondissement of Paris and have one son, who was born in November 2010.

References

1966 births
Living people
University of Paris alumni
People from Aix-les-Bains
French television presenters
French television journalists
French people of Italian descent
People of Emilian descent